Saint Michaels Mill (also known as Quillens Mill) is a gristmill in Saint Michaels, Talbot County, Maryland first built in 1890 and expanded several times until the 1930s.  Its chief product was "Just Right Flour".

It is located at 100 Chew Avenue.  The building architect is Arthur K. Easter.

The mill is a good example of 19th century industrial architecture on Maryland's Eastern Shore.  The milling equipment is original to the structure, mostly intact and still operative.

It was added to the U.S. National Register of Historical Places in 1982.

References

External links
, including photo dated 1982, at Maryland Historical Trust

Buildings and structures in Talbot County, Maryland
Industrial buildings completed in 1890
Grinding mills in Maryland
Saint Michaels, Maryland
National Register of Historic Places in Talbot County, Maryland
Grinding mills on the National Register of Historic Places in Maryland